The 1905 Yorkshire Cup competition was a knock-out competition between (mainly professional) rugby league clubs from  the  county of Yorkshire. 1905 was the inaugural year for the Rugby League Yorkshire Cup competition. The cup was won by Hunslet who beat Halifax by a score of 13-3.

Background 
Following the great schism of 1895 which led to the formation of rugby league there appear to be very little interest in a competitive competition organised on a regional basis, at least between clubs based in Yorkshire. Prior to the breakaway from rugby union this was something that had been discouraged as it was feared that competition would lead to professionalism, as had happened in other sports like Association Football.
One of the exceptions was the trophy played for by the Yorkshire Rugby Union clubs. "T'owd Tin Pot", or officially, the Yorkshire Challenge Cup. The Governing body of the RFU were appalled at the idea, but turned a blind eye as all the proceeds from the final were distributed among various charities.

It was around 10 years after the "great schism" before the idea of a County Cup for the Rugby League game became a reality. There appears to be very little, if any, details of how the introduction of the county cup competitions came about, or any details of any of the instigators or of any campaign, but the County Cups became the last part of what would become known as the four cups.
The competitions were played on the same basis as was the Challenge Cup, i.e. a free draw with matches played on a sudden death straight knock-out basis, and with the final played (usually) on a neutral ground.

Competition and Results 
For this inaugural competition, a total of twenty clubs had entered, and so a preliminary round was introduced involving eight clubs, to reduce the number of clubs taking part in the main competition to sixteen, a full complement for a four round knock-out tournament.

Preliminary round 
Involved 4 matches and 8 clubs

Round 1 
Involved 5 matches (with three byes) and 13 Clubs

Round 1 - Replays 
Involved 1 match and 2 Clubs

Round 2 - Quarterfinals 
Involved 4 matches and 8 Clubs

Round 2 - Replays 
Involved 1 match and 2 Clubs

Round 3 – semifinals 
Involved 2 matches and 4 Clubs

Semifinal - Replays 
Involved 1 match and 2 Clubs

Final 

The match was played at Park Avenue in the City of Bradford, now in West Yorkshire. The attendance was 18,500 and receipts were £465.

Teams and scorers 

Points Value: Try = 3 points; Goal (any type)= 2 points

The road to success 
The following chart excludes any preliminary round fixtures/results

Notes and comments 
1 * Featherstone Rovers were at the time a junior/amateur club from FeatherstonE
2 * Outwood Parish Church were a junior/amateur club from Outwood (a district to the North of Wakefield) who were playing in the Yorkshire Second Competition (Eastern Section)
3 * Saville Green were a junior/amateur club from the East Leeds area
4 * RUGBYLEAGUEproject gives Bramley as the home team (and playing at Barley Mow) but the official Hull F.C. archives give the venue as Boulevard, Hull FC's home ground.
5 * Match abandoned after 63 minutes due to "bad light"
6 * Unknown reason for replayed fixture being reversed instead at Craven Park.
7 * Park Avenue was the home ground of Bradford from 1880 until "The Great Betrayal", in 1907. Although the ground capacity is not known it is estimated to have been between 20,000-30,000

See also 
1905–06 Northern Rugby Football Union season
Rugby league county cups

References

External links
Saints Heritage Society
1896–97 Northern Rugby Football Union season at wigan.rlfans.com
Hull&Proud Fixtures & Results 1896/1897
Widnes Vikings - One team, one passion Season In Review - 1896-97
The Northern Union at warringtonwolves.org

RFL Yorkshire Cup
Yorkshire Cup